Zhang Zilin is a Chinese actress, singer, fashion model and beauty queen who won Miss China World in 2007 and later was crowned as Miss World 2007.

Biography
Zhang was born in Weihai, Shandong, on March 22, 1984. She then moved to Haidian District, Beijing, where she attended high school from 1996 to 2002. She later completed her studies at the University of Science and Technology Beijing and obtained a degree in business administration in 2006. Zhang is now working as a fashion model.

Early life
Having grown up in an academically oriented family, Zhang has always valued her education and has had many achievements in her studies. Both a scholar and an athlete, Zhang Zilin began training in various types of sports at the age of eight. She excels in the Triple Jump and Hurdles and has undergone professional training in the 100 meter Hurdles, having won in the 10th Beijing City Youth Games in 1999.

In 2002, Zhang finished high school and commenced her studies at the University of Science and Technology Beijing where she graduated in 2006. As an undergraduate, she competed in and won many athletic competitions. In 2005, she won the "Sports Advance Distinction Award" at her university.

Modeling career

Zhang's career in modeling and pageantry started in 2003 where she participated in a beauty pageant organized by New Silk Road Modeling Agency. As a first timer in pageantry, Zhang only managed to land herself in the top 10 due to lack of experience. However, she was later discovered by the executive manager of the agency, Lee Xiaobai. Since then Zhang has graced the runways in major fashion capitals of the world including Paris and Berlin.

In 2006, she was shortlisted as one of the top ten professional supermodels during the Chinese Fashion and Culture Awards. After that she participated in Giorgio Armani's 2007 Autumn/Winter Collection show in Paris and later earned herself the title of "Top Model of the Year" from New Silk Road modeling agency.

On December 1, 2007, she was crowned Miss World 2007 at the Crown of Beauty Theatre in Sanya, Hainan. During her reign, she traveled to over 80 cities in 20 countries. Some of these countries are the United Kingdom, the United States, Russia, Mexico, Trinidad and Tobago, Vietnam, and South Africa.

Film career
Zhang made her debut in 2011 film The Underdog Knight 2 and 2014 Hong Kong fantasy film The Monkey King.

Personal life
In 2013, she married Nie Lei in Phuket, Thailand and in April 2016, she gave birth to a daughter.

Music
Zhang lent her voice for the 2008 Summer Olympics soundtrack and also appeared in the music video for the same song entitled Beijing Welcomes You.

Filmography
 He-Man (2011)
 Badges of Fury (2013)
 The Monkey King (2014)
 The Break-Up Artist (2014)
 Bugs (2014)
 Meet Miss Anxiety (2014)
 Spicy Hot in Love (2016)

References

External links

 Zhang Zi Lin's website
 Zhang Zi Lin's blog
 Miss World 2007 - Zhang Zi Lin's Official Profile at Miss World Official Website
 Zi Lin Zhang's album
 Miss World 2007 at South Asian Biz
 

1984 births
Living people
Chinese beauty pageant winners
Chinese female models
Miss World 2007 delegates
Miss World winners
Musicians from Shandong
People from Weihai
21st-century Chinese actresses
Chinese film actresses
21st-century Chinese women singers